The black-capped warbling finch (Microspingus melanoleucus) is a species of bird in the family Thraupidae.
It is found in Argentina, Bolivia, Brazil, Paraguay and western Uruguay.
Its natural habitats are subtropical or tropical dry forests, subtropical or tropical dry shrubland, and subtropical or tropical high-altitude shrubland.

References

black-capped warbling finch
Birds of Argentina
Birds of Bolivia
Birds of Paraguay
black-capped warbling finch
Taxonomy articles created by Polbot